Municipal Waste is the debut EP by Richmond crossover thrash band, Municipal Waste. Like many of the band's early releases, it has a short run time of only 7:09.

Track listing

Personnel
Brendon Trache	- drums
Andy Harris - bass
Tony Foresta - vocals
Ryan Waste - guitars

Municipal Waste (band) EPs
2001 debut EPs